Kristina Josefin Neldén, (born 17 December 1984) is a Swedish actress. She made her film debut in the 2005 film Tjenare kungen by director Ulf Malmros. She made her stage debut in the 2007 play En måste ju leva at Angereds Teater in Gothenburg. In 2014, she was nominated for a Guldbagge award for Best Supporting role as Lena in Shed No Tears. The film was based on the lyrics and music of singer Håkan Hellström.

References

External links 

Living people
1984 births
Swedish actresses
People from Gothenburg